Kathleen Horvath was the defending champion but lost in the first round to Silvia La Fratta.

Arantxa Sánchez won in the final 6–0, 7–5 against Raffaella Reggi.

Seeds
A champion seed is indicated in bold text while text in italics indicates the round in which that seed was eliminated.

  Zina Garrison (quarterfinals)
  Katerina Maleeva (second round)
  Raffaella Reggi (final)
  Arantxa Sánchez (champion)
  Isabel Cueto (semifinals)
  Neige Dias (quarterfinals)
  Kathleen Horvath (first round)
  Mercedes Paz (quarterfinals)

Draw

References
 1988 Belgian Open Draw

Belgian Open (tennis)
1988 WTA Tour